The 2022 United States House of Representatives elections in Arkansas were held on November 8, 2022, to elect the four U.S. representatives from the state of Arkansas, one from each of the state's four congressional districts. The elections coincided with the Arkansas gubernatorial election, as well as other elections to the U.S. House of Representatives, elections to the U.S. Senate, and various state and local elections. Primary elections were held on May 24.

Overview

District

District 1 

The incumbent is Republican Rick Crawford, who was re-elected unopposed in 2020. The new 1st district covers the Northeast corner of the state — very similar to its predecessor — but now comprises a greater portion of the state's Northern border.

Republican primary

Candidates

Nominee 
 Rick Crawford, incumbent U.S. representative

Eliminated in primary 
 Jody Shackelford, attorney
 Brandt Smith, state representative

Endorsements

Results

Democratic primary

Candidates

Nominee 
Monte Hodges, state representative

General election

Predictions

Results

District 2 

The incumbent is Republican French Hill, who was re-elected with 55.4% of the vote in 2020. The 2nd district has been the most competitive district in recent years, but redistricting — including dividing Little Rock — makes the district less competitive going forward. The 2nd district still comprises the central part of Arkansas.

Republican primary

Candidates

Nominee 
 French Hill, incumbent U.S. representative

Eliminated in primary 
Conrad Reynolds, veteran

Endorsements

Results

Democratic primary

Candidates

Nominee 
 Quintessa Hathaway, educator and public advocate

Withdrawn 
 Nick Cartwright, former Rose Bud city council member (running for State Senate)

Libertarian convention

Candidates

Nominee 
Michael White

General election

Predictions

Results

District 3 

The incumbent is Republican Steve Womack, who was re-elected with 64.3% of the vote in 2020. The new 3rd district is slightly more competitive than its predecessor, but it is more compact too; the district now comprises only the Northwest corner of the state.

Republican primary

Candidates

Nominee 
 Steve Womack, incumbent U.S. representative

Eliminated in primary 
 Neil Robinson Kumar, law student

Endorsements

Results

Democratic primary

Candidates

Nominee 
 Lauren Mallett-Hays, speech-language pathologist

Libertarian convention

Candidates

Nominee 
Michael Kalagias, candidate for this seat in 2018 and 2020

General election

Predictions

Results

District 4 

The incumbent is Republican Bruce Westerman, who was re-elected with 69.7% of the vote in 2020. The new 4th district still comprises the majority of the Southern part of the state, and it is now slightly more competitive. Unusually for a member of his party, Democratic nominee John White strongly denied the legitimacy of President Joe Biden and the 2020 United States presidential election.

Republican primary

Candidates

Nominee 
 Bruce Westerman, incumbent U.S. representative

Endorsements

Democratic primary

Candidates

Nominee 
 John White

Libertarian convention

Candidates

Nominee 
Gregory Maxwell

General election

Predictions

Results

References

External links 
 
 
  (State affiliate of the U.S. League of Women Voters)
 
 Arkansas Secretary of State

2022
Arkansas
United States House of Representatives